KXBZ (104.7 FM) is a radio station broadcasting a New Country format. Licensed to Manhattan, Kansas, United States, the station serves the Manhattan-Topeka-Salina area. The station went on the air as KTDF on May 3, 1990.  On September 30, 1994, the station changed its call sign to the current KXBZ. At the time, it was the third station to be part of Manhattan Broadcasting Co., Inc.

References

External links

XBZ
Country radio stations in the United States
Radio stations established in 1994
1994 establishments in Kansas